Hynoski is a surname. Notable people with the surname include:

Henry Hynoski (born 1988), American football player
Henry Hynoski Sr. (born 1953), American football player